The Rio do Rasto Formation is a Late Permian sedimentary geological formation in the South Region of Brazil. The official name is Rio do Rasto, although in some publications it appears as Rio do Rastro.

Geography 
It is found mainly in the Brazilian states of Santa Catarina, Paraná, and Rio Grande do Sul. It was formed during the Late Permian epoch of the Permian period.

Fossil content 
The following fossils have been uncovered from the formation:

 Flora
 Schizoneura
 Glossopteris
 Paracalamites
 Pecopteris
 Bivalves
 Leinzia
 Palaeomutela
 Terraia
 Gastropods
 Pseudestheria
 Monoleiolophus
 Euestheria
 Asmussia
 Liograpta
 Dicynodonts
 Endothiodon
 Rastodon procurvidens
 Amphibians
 Australerpeton cosgriffi
 Bageherpeton longignathus
 Konzhukovia sangabrielensis
 Parapytanga catarinensis
 Rastosuchus hammeri
 Fish
 Paranaichthys longianalis

See also 
 List of dinosaur-bearing rock formations
 Fremouw Formation
 Irati Formation
 Rio Bonito Formation

References

Bibliography 
    
 

Geologic formations of Brazil
Permian System of South America
Permian Brazil
Changhsingian
Shale formations
Sandstone formations
Fluvial deposits
Formations
Permian southern paleotemperate deposits
Fossiliferous stratigraphic units of South America
Paleontology in Brazil
Formations
Formations
Formations
Formations
Formations
Formations